Laramie  is a city in and the county seat of Albany County, Wyoming, United States. The population was estimated 32,711 in 2019, making it the third-largest city in Wyoming after Cheyenne and Casper. Located on the Laramie River in southeastern Wyoming, the city is north west of Cheyenne, at the junction of Interstate 80 and U.S. Route 287.

Laramie was settled in the mid-19th century along the Union Pacific Railroad line, which crosses the Laramie River at Laramie. It is home to the University of Wyoming, WyoTech, and a branch of Laramie County Community College. Laramie Regional Airport serves Laramie. The ruins of Fort Sanders, an army fort predating Laramie, lie just south of the city along Route 287. Located in the Laramie Valley between the Snowy Range and the Laramie Range, the city draws outdoor enthusiasts with its abundance of outdoor activities.

In 2011, Laramie was named as one of the best cities in which to retire by Money Magazine, which cited its scenic location, low taxes, and educational opportunities.

History 
Laramie was named for Jacques LaRamie, a French or French-Canadian trapper who disappeared in the Laramie Mountains in the early 1820s and was never heard from again. He was one of the first Europeans to visit the area. European-American settlers named a river, mountain range, peak, US Army fort, county, and city for him. More Wyoming landmarks are named for him than for any other trapper but Jim Bridger. Because the name was used so frequently, the town was called Laramie City for decades to distinguish it from other uses.

The city was founded in the mid-1860s as a tent city near the Overland Stage Line route, the Union Pacific portion of the first transcontinental railroad, and just north of Fort Sanders army post. The rails reached Laramie on May 4, 1868 when construction crews worked through town. A few passengers arrived on that same day. The first regular passenger service began on May 10, 1868, by which time entrepreneurs were building more permanent structures. Laramie City (as it was known in early years) soon had stores, houses, a school, and churches.

The frontier town initially suffered from lawlessness. Its first mayor, M. C. Brown, resigned his office on June 12, 1868 after six turbulent weeks, saying that the other officials elected alongside him on May 2 were guilty of "incapacity and laxity" in dealing with the city's problems.  This was due to the threat to the community from three half-brothers, early Old West gunman "Big" Steve Long, Con Moyer and Ace Moyer. Long was Laramie's first marshal, and with his brothers owned the saloon Bucket of Blood. The three began harassing settlers, forcing them to sign over the deeds to their property to them. Any who refused were killed, usually goaded into a gunfight by Long. By October 1868, Long had killed 13 men.

The first Albany County sheriff, rancher N. K. Boswell, organized a "Vigilance Committee" in response. On October 28, 1868, Boswell led the committee into the Bucket of Blood, overwhelmed the three brothers, and lynched them at an unfinished cabin down the street. Through a series of other lynchings and other forms of intimidation, the vigilantes reduced the "unruly element" and established a semblance of law and order.

In 1869, Wyoming was organized as Wyoming Territory, the first legislature of which passed a bill granting equal political rights to women in the territory. In March 1870, five Laramie residents became the first women in the world to serve on a jury. As Laramie was the first town in Wyoming to hold a municipal election, on September 6, 1870, Laramie resident Louisa Swain was the first woman in the United States to cast a legal vote in a general election.

Early businesses included rolling mills, a railroad-tie treatment plant, a brick yard, a slaughterhouse, a brewery, a glass manufacturing plant, and a plaster mill, as well as the railroad yards. In 1886, a plant to produce electricity was built.  Several regional railroads were based in Laramie, including the Laramie, North Park and Pacific Railroad and Telegraph Company founded in 1880 and the Laramie, North Park and Western Railroad established in 1901.

Governor Francis E. Warren signed a bill that established the University of Wyoming (UW) in 1886, the only public university in the state. Laramie was chosen as its site, and UW opened there in 1887. Under the terms of the Morrill Act, also known as the Land Grant College Act, in 1891 UW added an agricultural college and experiment station to gain benefits as a land grant college.

Late 20th century to present
The city was covered by international media in 1998 after the murder of Matthew Shepard, who was a gay student at the University of Wyoming. His murder generated an international outcry. It became the symbolic focus for a nationwide campaign against gay hate crimes. Federal hate crimes legislation was signed into law in 2009. As of September 2021, Wyoming does not have a hate crimes law, having failed to pass its most recent attempt at a hate crimes law in March 2021. Shepard's murder was the subject of the award-winning play, later adapted as a movie, The Laramie Project.

In 2004, Laramie became the first city in Wyoming to pass a law to prohibit smoking in enclosed workplaces, including bars, restaurants and private clubs. Opponents of the clean indoor air ordinance, funded in part by the R.J. Reynolds Tobacco Company, immediately petitioned to have the ordinance repealed. However, the voters upheld the ordinance in a citywide referendum which was conducted concurrently with the 2004 general election. The opponents challenged the validity of the election in court, claiming various irregularities. However, the judge ruled that the opponents had failed to meet their burden of showing significant problems with the election, and the ordinance, which had become effective in April 2005, remained in effect. In August 2005, Laramie's City Council defeated an attempt to amend the ordinance to allow smoking in bars and private clubs.

Geography
Laramie is located at  (41.312927, −105.587251).

The Laramie River runs through Laramie toward its confluence with the North Platte River east of the Laramie Range.

Laramie lies along U.S. Route 30, Interstate 80, and U.S. Route 287, and it remains an important junction on the Union Pacific Railroad line.

Climate
Laramie's total precipitation averages about  a year, and the average number of rainy days per year is about 86. Annual snowfall averages . Because of the high elevation, winters are long, and summers are short and relatively cool. The growing season is short, as the average window for freezing temperatures is September 14 through June 6, while for accumulating (≥) it is October 5 through May 12.

Laramie has a semi-arid climate (Köppen climate classification BSk) with long, cold, dry winters and short, warm, somewhat wetter summers.

Demographics

2010 census
As of the census of 2010, there were 30,816 people, 13,394 households, and 5,843 families residing in the city. The racial makeup of the city was 89.5% White, 3.2% Asian, 2.8% from two or more races, 2.5% from other races, 1.3% African American, 0.7% Native American, and 0.1% Pacific Islander. 9.2% of residents were Hispanic or Latino of any race.

There were 13,394 households, of which 20.4% had children under the age of 18 living with them, 33.0% were married couples living together, 6.9% had a female householder with no husband present, 3.7% had a male householder with no wife present, and 56.4% were non-families. 36.9% of all households were made up of individuals, and 6.2% had someone living alone who was 65 years of age or older. The average household size was 2.14 and the average family size was 2.85.

The median age in the city was 25.4 years. 15.9% of residents were under the age of 18; 32.7% were between the ages of 18 and 24; 26.5% were from 25 to 44; 17.4% were from 45 to 64; and 7.5% were 65 years of age or older. The gender makeup of the city was 52.0% male and 48.0% female.

2000 census
As of the census of 2000, there were 27,204 people, 11,336 households, and 5,611 families residing in the city. The population density was 2,442.5 people per square mile (942.9/km2). There were 11,994 housing units at an average density of 1,076.9 per square mile (415.7/km2). The racial makeup of the city was 90.81% White, 1.24% African American, 0.89% Native American, 1.92% Asian, 0.06% Pacific Islander, 2.89% from other races, and 2.19% from two or more races. Hispanic or Latino of any race were 7.94% of the population.

There were 11,336 households, out of which 23.0% had children under the age of 18 living with them, 38.3% were married couples living together, 8.0% had a female householder with no husband present, and 50.5% were non-families. 33.2% of all households were made up of individuals, and 6.4% had someone living alone who was 65 years of age or older. The average household size was 2.19 and the average family size was 2.83.

In the city, the population was spread out, with 17.5% under the age of 18, 31.8% from 18 to 24, 25.8% from 25 to 44, 16.8% from 45 to 64, and 8.1% who were 65 years of age or older. The median age was 25 years. For every 100 females, there were 107.0 males. For every 100 females age 18 and over, there were 106.7 males.

The median income for a household in the city was $27,319, and the median income for a family was $43,395. Males had a median income of $30,888 versus $22,009 for females. The per capita income for the city was $16,036. About 11.1% of families and 22.6% of the population were below the poverty line, including 15.7% of those under age 18 and 8.3% of those age 65 or over.

Arts and culture

Annual cultural events

Laramie Jubilee Days started in 1940 to celebrate Wyoming Statehood Day on July 10. Since then, Jubilee Days has expanded to include several days around the Fourth of July. Events typically include food, live music, games, carnival rides, a street fair, a parade, a softball tournament, and rodeo events.

Museums and concert halls
The Geological Museum at the University of Wyoming is open to the public and houses more than 50,000 catalogued mineral, rock, and fossil specimens, including a dinosaur exhibit. The university's art museum offers gallery exhibits, lectures, workshops, classes, and public tours year-round. The Fine Arts Concert Hall on campus presents frequent concerts and recitals during the school year. Housed in the Ivinson Mansion near the center of town is the Laramie Plains Museum. The Wyoming Children's Museum and Nature Center has interactive exhibits and pottery classes for children aged 3 and older. In 2012, the Wyoming House for Historic Women was opened in downtown Laramie.

Libraries
William Robertson Coe Library, the main library of the University of Wyoming, has materials for general research in business, education, fine arts, science, humanities, and the social sciences as well as audio visual and government documents collections. The Brinkerhoff Geology Library specializes in geology, geophysics, physical geography, mining and petroleum geology, and geological engineering. Also at the university are the George W. Hooper Law Library, the Library Annex, a high-density storage facility located in the basement of the UW Science Complex, the Rocky Mountain Herbarium Library, a learning resources center with materials for teachers and children, and an archives, rare book, and manuscript repository known as the American Heritage Center.

National Register sites

Twenty-one sites in Laramie, including the Wyoming Territorial Penitentiary, are included on the National Register of Historic Places (NRHP). The prison site includes buildings and other exhibits from a frontier community of the late 19th century. The other sites are the Downtown Laramie Historic District, the Ivinson Mansion and Grounds, Old Main on the University of Wyoming campus, the Barn at Oxford Horse Ranch, Bath Ranch, Bath Row, Charles E. Blair House, John D. Conley House, Cooper Mansion, East Side School, Fort Sanders Guardhouse, William Goodale House, Lehman-Tunnell Mansion, Lincoln School, Richardson's Overland Trail Ranch, St. Matthew's Cathedral Close, St. Paulus Kirche, Snow Train Rolling Stock, Union Pacific Athletic Club, and the Vee Bar Ranch Lodge.

Two other Albany County sites near Laramie are on the NRHP. Oakes Ames was also implicated in the Credit Mobilier scandal and censured by the U.S. House. The other site is Como Bluff, a long ridge extending east–west between Rock River and Medicine Bow. Geologic formations in the ridge contain fossils, including dinosaurs, from the Late Jurassic.

Sports

College
The University of Wyoming Cowboys compete at the NCAA Division I level (FBS-Football Bowl Subdivision for football) as a member of the Mountain West Conference.  UW offers 17 NCAA-sanctioned sports teams – nine women's sports and eight men's sports. Wyoming's nine NCAA sports for women include basketball; cross country; golf; soccer; swimming and diving; tennis; indoor track & field; outdoor track and field; and volleyball. UW's eight NCAA sports for men include basketball; cross country; football; golf; swimming and diving; indoor track and field; outdoor track and field; and wrestling.

Outdoor
Popular activities include skiing, snowmobiling, mountain biking, hunting, fishing, and hiking.

Miles of snowmobile trails wind through the forests, and many forest areas are open to travel by snowshoe.

Laramie is a center for mountain biking. Mountain bike trails meander through forests in the Laramie Range and the Snowy Range. The Medicine Bow Mountain Bike Patrol, part of the Laramie Bicycling Network, is a non-profit volunteer organization that works with the Forest Service to patrol and maintain biking trails east of Laramie. It starts near the town of Albany and Lake Owen and extends south to the town of Mountain Home near the Wyoming–Colorado border.

Other annual events include the Poker Run recreational ski race held in the Snowy Mountains each February, and the Tour De Laramie, a bicycle rally with stops at local pubs held in May. The Wyoming Marathon Races, a series of running and ultra-running events held in Medicine Bow National Forest, are held annually each Memorial Day weekend.

Trout fishing is another popular sport in and near Laramie. The Laramie River, which flows north into Wyoming from Colorado, is fished as are the smaller streams in both mountain ranges and the many small plains lakes in the Laramie Basin.

Other outdoor activities popular near Laramie include camping, picnicking, rafting on the Laramie River and the North Platte River, viewing of wildlife such as mule deer, elk, moose, and pronghorn, and general sightseeing. For  of its length as it crosses the Snowy Range, the Highway 130 corridor has been designated a National Forest Scenic Byway.

Parks and recreation
Laramie has 14 city parks that, among them, include playgrounds, seasonal wading pools, jogging and biking paths, baseball and softball fields, basketball hoops, a skateboard park, horseshoe pits, tennis courts, volleyball courts, a fitness circuit court, soccer fields, picnic tables, river fishing, and a seasonally stocked fishing pond. In addition to a public country club and golf course, Laramie residents also have access to the University of Wyoming's 18-hole golf course, and to a wide variety of university recreation sites including squash courts, handball courts, baseball and softball diamonds, basketball courts, a climbing wall, and fields for football, soccer, and track.

The Community Recreation Center has an outdoor swimming pool, an indoor pool, an eight-lane lap pool, water slides, a full-court gymnasium, cardio equipment, circuit weights, and an indoor playground, and it offers programs in adult fitness, youth volleyball, junior basketball, and aquatics. The Community Ice Arena is open for ice skating, skating lessons, hockey, synchronized skating, adult co-ed broomball, and other ice-related activities from October through mid-March. A children's hockey club, a figure skating club, university hockey teams, and adult non-check hockey teams as well as the general public use the ice arena.

Environmental problems
The site has been storing a 1,000-ton pile of contaminated flue dust from Bunker Hill Mine and Smelting Complex, an Idaho superfund site, under a tarp since the 1980s. In 2011 L.C. Holdings entered the DEQ's "Voluntary Remediation Program".

Government and laws

Laramie has a council–manager form of government. The council, the city's legislative body, consists of nine members who serve overlapping four-year terms. The council members set policy, approve budgets, pass ordinances, appoint citizen volunteers to advisory boards, and oversee the city staff. Two members of the council are elected from each of three wards. The council picks a mayor and vice-mayor once every two years at the first council meeting in January. Laramie is the county seat of Albany County and houses county offices, courts, and the county library.

In 2015, Laramie passed an LGBT anti-discrimination bill. The ordinance bans discrimination against LGBT people in employment, housing and public accommodations such as bars and restaurants.

Education
Albany County School District#1, the only school district in the county, is headquartered in Laramie. It governs 19 public schools in an area of  including Laramie, Centennial, Rock River, and rural locations. A total of about 4,000 students attend these schools, the Laramie fraction of which includes seven elementary schools, one middle school, Laramie High School, and Whiting High School. Snowy Range Academy, a charter school, serves children in grades K–7. The University of Wyoming also offers a Lab School (colloquially referred to as "Prep") for K–9 students.

St. Laurence, a Catholic school of the Roman Catholic Diocese of Cheyenne, formerly served children in grades K–6. It opened in 1951 and in 2016 it had 30 students. It closed on June 30, 2016 as its costs had increased and the numbers of students had declined. Laramie Montessori School now occupies the campus.

The main campus of the University of Wyoming is in Laramie. In 2009, about 13,400 students were enrolled there at the undergraduate, graduate, and professional levels. A branch campus of Laramie County Community College is also in Laramie.

The WyoTech campus offers 9-month courses in Automotive Technology, Collision & Refinishing Technology, and Diesel Technology, as well as a variety of specialized industry programs—including High-Performance Power Trains, Street Rod, Trim and Upholstery, Chassis Fabrication, and Applied Service Management.

Media
The Laramie Boomerang is Laramie's main newspaper. The Branding Iron is a student-run newspaper at the University of Wyoming. Wyoming Public Television station KCWC-DT, licensed to Central Wyoming College in Riverton, has a transmitter near Laramie known as KWYP-DT.

Many radio stations broadcast from Laramie. Three are Wyoming Public Radio stations: KUWR, 91.9 FM; KUWY, 88.5 FM, classical, and KUWL, 90.1 FM, jazz. The others are KOCA-LP, 93.5 FM, Spanish; KCGY, 95.1 FM, country; KIMX, 104.5 FM, top 40 (CHR); KLMI 106.1, Variety, KRQU, 98.7 FM, classic rock; KARS, 102.9 FM, classic rock; KHAT, 1210 AM, country; and KOWB, 1290 AM, news and talk.

In popular culture
The Man from Laramie was a 1955 western film starring James Stewart. It was shot in the Bonanza Creek Ranch and other places near Santa Fe, New Mexico.

In July 2017, the 83-year-old Fuller visited the city for the very first time, serving as grandmaster of Laramie's annual Jubilee Days parade and festivities.

Laramie in its early days is also featured in Seasons 4 and 5 of the AMC western television drama series Hell On Wheels, set in California and in Laramie.

In addition to The Laramie Project and the play from which it was adapted, several other cultural depictions of Matthew Shepard are set in Laramie.

In 2011, German actor and writer Joachim Meyerhoff wrote his first novel, Amerika, about the year he spent as a student in Laramie. The book was a bestseller in Germany.

Teenage Bottlerocket, an American punk rock band, formed in Laramie in 2000.

Infrastructure and transportation

Major highways
  East-West Interstate running from California to New Jersey. Intersects US 287 in Laramie.
  Alternate Business Route running from I-80 just east of Laramie, concurrent with Grand Avenue, through the city to North 3rd Street, US 287.

Airport
SkyWest Airlines (United) provides daily commercial flights between Laramie Regional Airport and Denver, Colorado. In addition to commercial flights, the airport serves private and corporate planes and atmospheric research aircraft from the University of Wyoming.

Ground Transportation
Laramie has multiple taxi companies, as well as Uber service, which launched in 2017.

For intercity service, Laramie is served by Greyhound Lines, with service to and from Cheyenne and Fort Collins. Green Ride of Northern Colorado provides service from Laramie to Fort Collins and Denver International Airport.

Laramie had passenger rail service from the Union Pacific until 1971. Amtrak continued service until 1983 on the Pioneer, then again from 1991 to 1997. Only curbside Thruway bus service is currently available.

The former Union Pacific passenger depot in Laramie was donated to the Laramie Plains Museum in 1985, and then to the Laramie Railroad Depot Association in 2009, which operates it as a small museum and a venue for community events.

Utilities
The city's drinking water comes from the Big Laramie River, the largest single source, and wellfields in the Casper Aquifer, and it is treated in a modern plant. The city's wastewater plant, which replaced an older plant, began operation in 1998.

Notable people
 Kim Barker New York Times Journalist and Author
 Craig Arnold (1967–c. 2009), poet, professor
 Thurman Arnold (1891–1969), lawyer
 Jim Beaver (born 1950), actor, writer, film historian
 Jaycee Carroll (born 1983), basketball player
 William L. Carlisle (1890–1964), one of America's last train robbers, lived in the town
 Jesseca Cross (born 1975), former track and field athlete
 Tommy Davidson (born 1963), actor
 Sheridan H. Downey (1884–1961), lawyer, U.S. Senator
 George Carr Frison (1924–2020), archaeologist
 Grace Raymond Hebard (1861–1936), Wyoming historian, suffragist, pioneering scholar, prolific writer, political economist and noted University of Wyoming educator
 H. L. Hix (born 1960), poet, academic
 Raymond A. Johnson (1912–1984), aviation pioneer
 Tom Lubnau (born 1958), politician and lawyer who served as Speaker of the Wyoming House of Representatives from 2013 to 2015
 Cody Lundin (born 1967), survival instructor; teaches modern wilderness survival skills, primitive living skills, urban preparedness, and homesteading
 William Mulloy (1917–1978), anthropologist
 Timothy Mellon (born 1942), businessman, and the chairman and majority owner of Pan Am Systems
 Edgar Wilson Nye (1850–1896), a.k.a. Edgar Wilson "Bill" Nye, nineteenth-century humorist, lived in Laramie from 1876-1887 
 Wayde Preston (1929–1992), actor
 Chip Rawlins (born 1949), writer
 Ken Sailors (1921-2016), basketball player, credited with inventing the jump shot, graduated from Laramie High School, in 1943 led the University of Wyoming Cowboys in winning the NCAA Men's Basketball Championship
 Matthew Shepard (1976–1998), University of Wyoming student, victim of hate-motivated murder
 Gerry Spence (born 1929), trial lawyer
 Pete Simpson (born 1930), university administrator, historian, politician
 Brad Watson (1955–2020), author, academic
 Jamila Wideman (born 1975), female left-handed point guard basketball player, lawyer

References

Further reading
 Emmett D. Chisum, "Boom Towns on the Union Pacific: Laramie, Benton, and Bear River City." Annals of Wyoming 53#1 (1981): 2-13.

External links

 City of Laramie, official website
 Laramie Chamber of Commerce
 1868 Lynching of Steve Long and Moyer brothers, Laramie City, Wyoming, Legends of America
 
 

 
Populated places established in 1868
Cities in Wyoming
Cities in Albany County, Wyoming
County seats in Wyoming
Micropolitan areas of Wyoming
1868 establishments in Wyoming Territory
Railway towns in Wyoming